Mor Pouye (born 21 November 1994) is a Senegalese former footballer who played as a midfielder.

References

External links

1994 births
Living people
Footballers from Dakar
Senegalese footballers
Association football midfielders
Liga I players
ACF Gloria Bistrița players
Louletano D.C. players
S.C. Olhanense players
Senegalese expatriate footballers
Senegalese expatriate sportspeople in Italy
Expatriate footballers in Italy
Senegalese expatriate sportspeople in Romania
Expatriate footballers in Romania
Expatriate footballers in Portugal
Senegalese expatriate sportspeople in Portugal